The NASCAR Camping World Truck Series has had many close finishes since its inception in 1995. The first points-paying race, won by Mike Skinner, had a margin of victory of nine hundredths of a second. The closest recorded finish in series history came six months later, as Skinner lost to Butch Miller by just one thousandth of a second.

Closest finishes

See also 
 Photo finish
 List of the closest NASCAR Cup Series finishes
 List of the closest NASCAR Xfinity Series finishes

External links 
 Racing-Reference.info Truck Series page 

Closest finishes
Closest NASCAR Truck Series finishes
Closest Truck Series finishes